The Pennsylvania Attorney General is the chief law enforcement officer of the Commonwealth of Pennsylvania. It became an elected office in 1980. The current acting attorney general is Democrat Michelle Henry.

On August 15, 2016, then-Attorney General Kathleen Kane was convicted of criminal charges, including conspiracy, perjury, and obstruction of justice, and announced her resignation the following day, effective August 17. Consequently, as the Solicitor General, Bruce Castor assumed the office as Acting Attorney General. Governor Tom Wolf nominated Bruce Beemer to serve out the remaining balance of Kane's term which expired in January 2017. Democrat Josh Shapiro succeeded Beemer. Shapiro was elected governor in 2022, and will appoint his successor as Attorney General upon assuming office in 2023.

Authority and responsibilities 
The Commonwealth Attorneys Act of 1980 established the Office of Attorney General as an independent office headed by an elected attorney general. The office has the responsibility for the prosecution of those crimes prosecuted by the commonwealth, including organized crime and public corruption, as well as civil litigation on behalf of some, but not all, commonwealth agencies and the civil enforcement of some commonwealth laws, including laws pertaining to consumer protection and charities. The attorney general represents the commonwealth in all actions brought by or against the commonwealth and reviews all proposed rules and regulations by commonwealth agencies.

The attorney general also serves as a member of the Board of Pardons, the joint Committee on Documents, the Hazardous Substances Transportation Board, the Board of Finance and Revenue, the Pennsylvania Commission on Crime and Delinquency, the Civil Disorder Commission and the Municipal Police Officers Education and Training Commission.

List of attorneys general

There have been four styles of selection of Pennsylvania Attorney General.  The first phase was colonial, with the first attorney general commissioned in 1683.  At the outbreak of the Revolution, the sitting attorney general, a loyalist, fled, and new attorneys general were appointed, under the Constitution of 1776, by the state president (or vice-president) with the Supreme Executive Council.  Under the new constitution of 1790, attorneys general were appointed by the governor, subject to approval by the legislature (similar to how the United States Attorney General is appointed by the president of the United States).  This remained in the Constitutions of 1838, 1874, and 1968.  In 1978, voters approved an amendment to the Pennsylvania Constitution making the office of the Pennsylvania Attorney General an elected position, effective as of the general election of 1980.

Note that before William Penn, there were attorneys general for New Sweden as early as 1643.

Colonial attorneys general

Under the influence of David Lloyd, who served 1686–1710, Pennsylvania developed its first judicial system.  Andrew Hamilton, who served 1717–1726, strongly influenced Pennsylvania law away from some aspects of the British system.

 John White
 Samuel Hersent
 John White
 David Lloyd
 John Moore
 Robert Assheton
 Paromlus Parmyter
 George Lowther
 Thomas Clarke
 Robert Quarry
 Henry Wilson
 Andrew Hamilton
 Joseph Growden Jr.
 John Kinsey
Tench Francis Sr.
 Benjamin Chew
 Andrew Allen

President/Council appointed attorneys general

Attorneys general appointed between 1791 and 1920

Attorneys general appointed between 1920 and 1980

Occupants of the elected Pennsylvania Attorney General office (1981–present)

See also 

Governor of Pennsylvania
 Pennsylvania General Assembly
 Pennsylvania Auditor General
 Pennsylvania Treasurer
 Pennsylvania State Capitol

References

External links
 Pennsylvania Attorney General official website
 Pennsylvania Attorney General articles at ABA Journal
 News and Commentary at FindLaw
 Pennsylvania Consolidated Statutes at Law.Justia.com
 U.S. Supreme Court Opinions - "Cases with title containing: State of Pennsylvania" at FindLaw
 Pennsylvania Bar Association
 Pennsylvania Attorney General Kathleen Kane profile at National Association of Attorneys General
 Press releases at Pennsylvania Attorney General

 
Lists of Pennsylvania politicians
1777 establishments in Pennsylvania